Applause Cheer Boo Hiss is an EP by Canadian indie rock band Land of Talk, released on April 4, 2006 on Dependent Music in Canada. It would later be released on Rebel Group Records in the United States on March 20, 2007.

Track listing
Speak to Me Bones - 3:31
Sea Foam - 3:32
Summer Special - 2:57
Breaxxbaxx - 3:37
Magnetic Hill - 4:26
All My Friends - 4:02
Street Wheels - 5:05

References

2006 EPs
Land of Talk albums